Georgi Kizilashvili (born 14 March 1983) is a Georgian judoka.

Achievements

External links
 

1983 births
Living people
Male judoka from Georgia (country)